Tropical apricot is a fruit and the plant that produces it, a hybrid between Dovyalis hebecarpa and D. abyssinica. It can also refer to other plants:

 Mammea americana
 Myrciaria glomerata, endemic to Brazil